Abbasabad (also Romanized as ‘Abbāsābād and Abbāsābād; also known as ‘Abbāsābād-e Kenār Jāddeh) is a village in Fazl Rural District, in the Central District of Nishapur County, Razavi Khorasan Province, Iran. At the 2006 census, its population was 288, in 79 families.

See also 

 List of cities, towns and villages in Razavi Khorasan Province

References 

Populated places in Nishapur County